Anders Erik Limpár (born 24 September 1965) is a Swedish former professional footballer who played as a midfielder.

Limpar featured for the clubs IF Brommapojkarna, Young Boys, Cremonese, Arsenal, Everton, Birmingham City, AIK, Colorado Rapids and Djurgårdens IF during a career that spanned between 1981 and 2002.

A full international between 1987 and 1996, Limpar was capped 58 times by Sweden, scoring 6 goals altogether. He represented Sweden at the 1988 Summer Olympics, the 1990 FIFA World Cup, UEFA Euro 1992, as well as the 1994 FIFA World Cup where Sweden finished third.

In 1991, he was awarded Guldbollen as Sweden's best footballer of the year.

Club career

Early career
Born in Solna with Hungarian roots, Limpar started playing football in Brommapojkarna, famous for its production of footballing talent. He then played for Örgryte, joining in the wake of its sensational Swedish championship title in 1985.  Limpar quickly became one of the hottest properties in Swedish football, and as so he was offered the chance to journey to Switzerland with Bern club Young Boys. He followed this up in a one-season spell in Italy with Cremonese during the 1989–90 season. That season Limpar was named Serie A's third best foreign player behind Diego Maradona and Lothar Matthäus.

Arsenal
His club career peaked when he signed for Arsenal on 8 July 1990 from Cremonese for £1m. Limpar quickly impressed in the Makita Tournament at Wembley and made his League debut in the 3–0 win at Wimbledon 25 August 1990. He went on to win the league title in the 1990–91 season. Limpar was also involved in the brawl against Manchester United 20 October 1990 and made the winning goal. He played a particularly notable part in the 1990–91 season, scoring some important goals, and impressing in his first season with exciting wing play and crowd-pleasing displays. These included a hat-trick against Coventry City in a 6–1 win on the final day of the league season, by which time Arsenal were already champions. He managed a total of 13 goals that season, with 11 of them coming in the league.

He won the GuldbollenSweden's Player of the Year awardin 1991.

In the season 1991–92, Limpar was in and out of the side. A jaw injury kept him out for several weeks but he still netted some spectacular goals including a 40 yard chip in Arsenals 4–0 win over Liverpool 20 April 1992. A succession of knocks hampered him the following season, and he sat on the sidelines injured for Arsenal's 1993 wins in both the League and the FA Cups. He and manager George Graham eventually fell out and with his contract due to come to an end in May 1994, Limpar, who was seeking a new deal at the club, was not offered one by Graham. Limpar played his last match with Arsenal against Southampton 19 March 1994. Limpar scored 20 goals from 116 appearances for Arsenal where he was popular with the fans.

Everton
On transfer deadline day in March 1994, Limpar transferred to Everton for £1.6 million. Limpar has revealed how he told reporters on the day he signed for Arsenal 1990, that he supported Everton.

He made his debut for Everton in a home defeat (1–0 to Tottenham Hotspur) on 26 March 1994. Limpar won a crucial penalty for Everton in the final day victory over Wimbledon in 1994, which preserved Everton's  Premiership status.

Whilst playing for the toffees he won the FA Cup for the first time in 1995. Limpar went on to play a vital role in the Cup final at Wembley, with a run from inside his own half leading to Everton's winning goal being scored by Paul Rideout. He also hit a memorable 50-yard reverse-pass which led to an Everton break-away that BBC commentator Barry Davies described as the 'pass of the match'.

He also went on to win the Charity Shield of 1995 with Everton.
As so, Limpar eventually fell out of favour at Goodison Park after 1995–96, making only two appearances for the club during the 1996–97 season.

Birmingham City
On 20 January 1997, Limpar was signed by Birmingham City for a fee of £100,000. He made his league debut on 1 February 1997, in a 2–1 away defeat against Bolton Wanderers. The move proved to be unfruitful, as he made only four appearances, before the club later ended his stay in April 1997.

Later career
Moving back to Sweden on a free transfer to AIK in the summer of 1997, he won the Allsvenskan title in 1998. After two years in Stockholm, he signed for Major League Soccer side Colorado Rapids in February 1999 where he stayed until November 2000. He then returned to Sweden to sign for Djurgårdens IF. However he failed to make an appearance for them and shortly went on to IF Brommapojkarna, where he started his club career. He eventually retired from the game in March 2001 at the age of 35, due to persistent injuries.

At the age of 56 Anders made a comeback for Hede IK in the Swedish Division 5 and scored a goal from half the football field.

International career
In total, Limpar won 58 caps for Sweden, scoring 6 goals between 1987 and 1996. He was a member of one of the most successful Sweden squads ever, the team that finished third at the 1994 FIFA World Cup in the United States. However, he did not have a large role during the tournament, making just one substitute appearance, in the 3rd-place match. He also represented Sweden at the 1988 Summer Olympics, 1990 FIFA World Cup, and UEFA Euro 1992.

Coaching career
Limpar began coaching the youth team at Djurgårdens IF. He was later appointed assistant manager for the Swedish second division team Sollentuna United. In October 2008, aged 43, he played a one-off game for Sollentuna United's reserve side in the position of left back.

Personal life
After retiring from football in 2001, Limpar opened a bar, The Limp Bar, in central Stockholm, although it has since closed. In 2012 Limpar, together with colleague Mikael Crona, founded Swedish company Super Lock which produces plastic boxes. He currently is the CEO of betting site BestBetToday.com.

Career statistics

International

 Scores and results list Sweden's goal tally first, score column indicates score after each Limpar goal.

Honours
Arsenal
First Division: 1990–91
FA Cup: 1992–93
League Cup: 1992–93

Everton
FA Cup: 1994–95
FA Charity Shield: 1995

AIK
Allsvenskan: 1998
Svenska Cupen: 1998–99

Sweden

 FIFA World Cup third place: 1994

Individual
Guldbollen: 1991
IF Brommapojkarna Hall of Fame: 2014

References

External links
 Anders Limpar on Twitter

Living people
1965 births
People from Solna Municipality
Association football midfielders
Swedish footballers
IF Brommapojkarna players
Örgryte IS players
BSC Young Boys players
U.S. Cremonese players
Arsenal F.C. players
Everton F.C. players
Birmingham City F.C. players
AIK Fotboll players
Colorado Rapids players
Djurgårdens IF Fotboll players
Allsvenskan players
Premier League players
English Football League players
Serie A players
Serie B players
Major League Soccer players
Swedish people of Hungarian descent
1990 FIFA World Cup players
1994 FIFA World Cup players
UEFA Euro 1992 players
Sweden international footballers
Sweden youth international footballers
Olympic footballers of Sweden
Footballers at the 1988 Summer Olympics
Major League Soccer All-Stars
Expatriate footballers in England
Expatriate footballers in Italy
Expatriate footballers in Switzerland
Expatriate soccer players in the United States
Swedish expatriate footballers
Swedish expatriate sportspeople in England
Swedish expatriate sportspeople in Italy
Swedish expatriate sportspeople in Switzerland
Swedish expatriate sportspeople in the United States
Djurgårdens IF Fotboll non-playing staff
FA Cup Final players
Sportspeople from Stockholm County